Tides (also known as The Colony) is a 2021 English-language German-Swiss science fiction thriller film directed and written by Tim Fehlbaum. The film stars Nora Arnezeder, Iain Glen, Sarah-Sofie Boussnina, and Joel Basman. Set in a future in which the Earth's elite leave the polluted planet to settle in a space colony on Kepler-209, it is about a team from Kepler who return to Earth several generations later to test whether it is suitable for human habitation.

The film had its worldwide premiere at the 71st Berlin International Film Festival.

Plot 
After a global catastrophe nearly wipes out humanity on Earth, Earth's elites fled to a Kepler-209 space colony. A young astronaut named Blake from the Kepler colony returns to Earth with fellow astronauts Tucker and Holden. Their mission is to test whether Earth is suitable for human habitation and reproduction. Kepler-209 residents have modern technology and space travel but they have become infertile from heavy radiation there. This is the second attempt to return to Earth.

The space capsule lands roughly on a tidal flat near the Henderson Hub, a weather beacon that broadcasts telemetry data back to Kepler-209. Holden is killed, while Tucker commits suicide after a band of fertile humans, nicknamed "The Muds", wounds him and captures him and Blake, and removes technology from the shuttle. Blake is imprisoned by the Muds and nearly drowns, but she is saved by a girl named Maila.

The Muds are invaded by a hostile group that kidnaps all of them. They are taken to a cargo ship that rises above the frequent floods and storms. The aggressors are led by a former Kepler-209 resident named Gibson, who was a survivor from a previous Earth mission led by Blake's father, once thought to have no survivors as its capsule was destroyed along with its communication equipment.

Blake realizes she is fertile, and she meets the children of the Muds, whom Gibson is educating. Gibson claims the Muds killed Blake's father, but Blake learns that he has been locked away because he sided with the Muds, believing that Kepler residents should never return to Earth. Gibson introduces Blake to his adoptive son and his partner - she claims that he saved her and her son from certain death. After a brief reunion, Blake discovers the girls are being held captive for Gibson's future breeding plans. She sides with the Muds, attacks the guards, and releases the girls and their families.

After freeing the Muds, she goes to free her father. She notices Gibson moving toward the Henderson Hub. Blake comes to know that Gibson's adoptive son Neil is actually her half-brother (after her father impregnated Neil’s mother). Blake’s fertility info is then attempted to be communicated by Gibson from the biometer which proves fertility of Keplers. She tries to stop news from Earth being broadcast back to Kepler-209, but Gibson sends the data. Blake strangles and drowns Gibson, almost drowning herself, but Maila's mother rescues her and revives her. Blake and her father rejoin the Muds and Neil and they set out in a tugboat. A closing scene shows the Mud children hidden from the prior Kepler raiders fearfully watching an approach of figures through the fog, which turn out to be their kidnapped parents returning safely home.

Cast
The cast include:
 Nora Arnezeder as Louise Blake,  an astronaut 
  as Young Louise
 Iain Glen as Gibson,  a Kepler astronaut from the first mission 
 Sarah-Sofie Boussnina as Narvik, a mudflat inhabitant
 Joel Basman as Paling, a mudflat inhabitant who serves as Gibson's lieutenant 
 Sebastian Roché as Blake, Louise's father (part of the first mission)
  as Maila,  Narvik's daughter 
 Sope Dirisu as Tucker, an astronaut from the second mission

Release
On February 11, 2021, Berlinale announced that the film would have its worldwide premiere at the 71st Berlin International Film Festival in the Berlinale Special section. The film was made available on Netflix in the US on January 11, 2022.

Reception

Critical response
Review aggregator Rotten Tomatoes gives the film a 43% approval rating based on 21 reviews, with an average rating of 5.4/10. On Metacritic, the film has a score of 48 out of 100, based on 5 critics, indicating "mixed or average reviews".

Accolades

References

External links
 
 Tides - Trailer  at BerghausWöbke Filmproduktion

2020s English-language films
2020s science fiction thriller films
German science fiction thriller films
Swiss science fiction thriller films
English-language German films
English-language Swiss films